Gülçin Ergül (born 30 October 1985) is a Turkish singer, songwriter, composer, dancer, choreographer, actress and yin yoga teacher.

Life and Career

1985–2004: Early years and education
Ergül started her music career by studying piano at Pera Fine Arts Academy. She was then selected to join the Atatürk Cultural Centre State Opera and Children's Ballet Ensemble as well as the Children's Choir. She began to pick up roles and perform as a child actress in theatre. She played in adaptations of Bird Man and the Prince, Cinderella, Sleeping Beauty and The King and I. She completed her high school education at Mimar Sinan Fine Arts University State Conservatory Ballet Department. She graduated with an undergraduate degree from Mimar Sinan Fine Arts University State Conservatory Modern Dance Education. She then continued to work on different dance routines with choreographers from all over the world. Ergül then started taking private singing lessons during her high school years.

2005–2009: Group Hepsi, Pepsi, Penti, Hepsi 1
In 2005, she established a girl-band by the name of Hepsi with Cemre Kemer, Yasemin Yürük, Eren Bakıcı, in which Gülçin Ergül was the lead vocalist. Cemre Kemer's mother is a famous manager, Şebnem Özberk. When they were nine years old, they were student at same conservatory and her mother begun to build the group. They released three albums, one EP and three soundtracks: Hepsi 1, Hepsi 2, Şaka (10+1), Tempo (Hepsi for Pepsi), Winx Club Turkish SoundTracks and "Jenerik Hepsi 1". In 2006 together with the band, she became the face of commercial brands Pepsi and Penti. She won more than 10 awards with Hepsi in Turkey. The band toured Turkey and abroad with Sezen Aksu and Kenan Doğulu in 2006 and 2007, respectively. They toured Turkey 7 times and abroad 2 times. She also guest starred with Hepsi in different TV series and movies. Hepsi then had a TV show in 2007 called Hepsi 1 which was aired by Turkish TV channels Show TV and ATV. She played the character "Gülçin" for two seasons. She has released with group their own stationery and school equipment line. This contains 160 different types of stationery equipment, varying from books, pens, pencils, art books, diaries etc. Ergül then left the band in 2009.

2011–2015: Solo career and Bravo!, Bir Tanecik Aşkım
Two years later in 2011, Ergül released her first solo EP album titled Bravo!. She recorded her first music video for the song "Ara Ara" which was number one in Billboard Türkiye. She then worked with the dancer and choreographer “David Hernandes” for "Ara Ara", who also has worked with the likes of Kylie Minogue and Mariah Carey. She then started to perform jingles for Star TV, Medipol University, Show TV, Tamek, Radio Fenomen and Radio Bilyoner.

She became the cover girl of Marie Claire, Trendy, WoMen, Salsa, Hey Girl, and Zoom magazine.

In 2015, she released her second solo EP album titled Bir Tanecik Aşkım. The music video for "Bir Tanecik Aşkım" garnered 41 million views on YouTube. She recorded an English version of the song called "My One and Only Love".

2016–2020:  Arabesk, Avon, All Together Now and Ağlat Beni
In 2016, she released another single called "Harabeyim", which the lyrics and music belong to her. In the same year Ergül also covered in a duet called "Ağlat Beni" with the Turkish singer Harun Kolçak. The song quickly became a hit in Turkey where the audio version reached 48 million streams and the music video reached 36 million views on YouTube. She toured Turkey with Harun Kolçak.

Ergül became the face of the Avon in 2018 and released a song for the brand. In August 2018, she released her conceptual project album, Arabesk. In the album, she reinterpreted old Arabesque songs using modern vocals. She has filmed music videos for the songs "İtirazım Var" and "İkimize Birden", which were featured in the album.

In 2019, she made a soundtrack for the movie Kim Daha Mutlu, which also has the same name. In the same year she released another single called "Hoş Geldin" which was also featured in the movie. Ergül became one of the main judges for Benimle Söyle, the Turkish version of All Together Now, for two seasons.

In 2020, she created a soul-trap single called "Ferman", whose lyrics and music belong to her. Due to the COVID-19 pandemic, the production process was completed indoors, in her own home. She also filmed the music video for the song at home.

2020–present: Davet, ALFA Awards, Invitation
Gülçin released her fourth studio album, Davet, on her birthday on 30 October 2020, from Arpej Production. In the album, which Emre Bayar was the music director, many different styles such as pop, trap, disco, R&B, and soul were combined. In addition to the new song titled "Sana Aşığım" by Yıldız Tilbe and the collaboration with Anıl Piyancı in the song  "Kalbime Sorsam", there are also 9 songs by Gülçin Ergül. The intro of the album and the song named "Davet", which is named after the album, express the mission of the album. The first music video for the album, "Beni Bu Rüyadan Uyandırma", was completed in 15 hours and was directed by Murat Joker. The singer, who danced in Vogue and High Heels style, was accompanied by four dancers. In the first 24 hours that the album was released, it was number one in the most purchased list in iTunes Turkey. She became the cover girl of the November 2020 issue of She & Girls magazine. During the launch period of the album, she was a guest as "Gülçin Ergül" in the 86th episode of Yasak Elma, a series on Fox, and sang the song "Sana Aşığım" from her latest album Davet. After the episode aired, "Sana Aşığım" was number 1 on the list of Shazam Turkey Top 50 and the Spotify list of TV Soundtracks.

At the end of 2020, which was heavily affected by the COVID-19 epidemic, Ergül released a single titled "Yeni Yılın Kutlu Olsun" (Happy New Year), whose lyrics and music belong to her and Ezgi Ayçe. More than 60,000 videos were made with the song in a short time on the international platform TikTok. She won an award named 2020 ALFA Awards with Kenan Doğulu that was given from Spain.

Ergül released her first English and fifth studio album, Invitation, on 16 April 2021 by Arpej Production. In the album, there are 7 songs by Gülçin Ergül and 2 songs by award-winning song writer Josephine Zwaan from the Netherlands. In addition, there is a cover version of "I Wanna Dance with Somebody (Who Loves Me)". The first music video for the album, "Don't Wake Me Up", the English version of "Beni Bu Rüyadan Uyandırma", was directed by Murat Joker. In the  first 24 hours that the album was released, it was number one in the most purchased list in iTunes Turkey and two songs in the album were number 2, number 3, number 5 and number 20 in the Breaking pop, Future hits, New music daily, New in pop lists in iTunes Turkey and US.

Throughout her music career, she has worked with Turkish musicians such as Sezen Aksu, Yıldız Tilbe, Mete Özgencil, Harun Kolçak, Ozan Doğulu, Kenan Doğulu, İskender Paydaş, Bülent Aris, Süleyman Yüksel, as well as RedOne, Marek Pompetzki, Toni Cottura, Michel Zitron.

Discography

Videography

Series and movies

Awards

References

External links 
 
 
 Gülçin Ergül on Spotify

1985 births
Turkish pop singers
Living people
21st-century Turkish singers
21st-century Turkish women singers